Keinath is a surname. Notable people with the surname include:

Charles Keinath (1885–1966), American college athlete
Pauline MacMillan Keinath (born 1934), American billionaire heiress